Shaheen Khan is a Pakistani actress. She is known for her roles in dramas Mohabbat Mushkil Hai, Maryam Periera, Haara Dil and Dulhan.

Early life
Shaheen was born in 1960 on 2nd July in Multan, Pakistan. She completed her studies from University of Multan.

Career
Shaheen made her debut as an actress on PTV in 1998. She was noted roles in dramas Agar Tum Na Hotay, Kahani Raima Aur Manahil Ki, Ishq Mein Teray, Meri Beti, Chup Raho and Shehr-e-Ajnabi. She also appeared in dramas Takkabur, Ishq Parast, Tere Mere Beech, Thora Sa Aasman, Kisay Chahoon, Mannchali and Kathputli. Since then she appeared in dramas Barfi Laddu, Dulhan, Haara Dil, Saza e Ishq, Ghisi Piti Mohabbat and Zebaish. In 2018 she appeared in movie Wajood.

Personal life
Shaheen is married to Farrukh Shahab and has three children.

Filmography

Television

Telefilm

Film

References

External links
 

1960 births
Living people
20th-century Pakistani actresses
Pakistani television actresses
21st-century Pakistani actresses
Pakistani film actresses